The 25th Anniversary album is the fifteenth album by the Irish folk and rebel band The Wolfe Tones, released in 1989 by Shanachie Records. It is both a new studio album and a greatest hits release as it features both new recordings unique to this record and old recordings from previous albums. New recordings include "Broad Black Brimmer" with an electric guitar and drums played during the final verse, "James Connolly", "Banna Strand", "Monsignor Horan", and "Come Out Ye Black and Tans", among others.

This album was the last to feature founding member Derek Warfield prior to his departure in 2001; it was also the last album to be recorded until the same year due to contract issues.

Track listing

CD One

 "Celtic Symphony"
 "Merry Ploughboy"
 "Women of Ireland
 "Rock on Rockall"
 "The Foggy Dew"
 "James Connolly"
 "The Man From Mullingar"
 "Flow Liffy Waters"
 "First of May"
 "The Piper That Played Before Moses"
 "The Big Strong Man"
 "Janie I'm Nearly Forty"
 "Give Me Your Hand"
 "The Boys of the Old Brigade"
 "Dingle Bay"
 "Monsignor Horan"

CD Two

 "Boston Rose"
 "The Zoological Gardens"
 "The Broad Black Brimmer"
 "Newgrange (Bru Na Boinne)"
 "Treat Me Daughter Kindly"
 "Come Out Ye Black and Tans"
 "Slieve Na Mban"
 "Far Away in Australia"
 "Goodbye"
 "Helicopter Song"
 "An Dord Feinne (Óró Sé Do Bheatha Bhaile)"
 "The Merman"
 "The Teddy Bears Head"
 "Banna Stand"
 "Many Young Men of Twenty"
 "The West's Awake"

The Wolfe Tones albums
1989 albums